John McCrae Kirk (13 March 1930 – 21 May 2003) was a footballer.

Kirk, was born in Canada, and moved to Scotland as a boy. He first played for Montrose, before joining Portsmouth as an amateur. However, his time at Portsmouth was interrupted while he spent two years in the military. He never played a game for Portsmouth, so he went to Accrington Stanley, where he played two seasons and scored one goal in 14 games.

References

External links 
John Kirk at Player History

1930 births
2003 deaths
Canadian emigrants to Scotland
Montrose F.C. players
Soccer players from Winnipeg
Canadian soccer players
English Football League players
Portsmouth F.C. players
Accrington Stanley F.C. (1891) players
Canadian expatriate soccer players
Canadian people of Scottish descent
Expatriate footballers in Scotland
Expatriate footballers in England
Scottish footballers
Association football inside forwards
Canadian expatriate sportspeople in Scotland
Canadian expatriate sportspeople in England